Serbian National Council may refer to:

 Serbian National Council of Bosnia and Herzegovina, former political organization
 Serbian National Council in Croatia (1990), former political organization
 Serbian National Council (Croatia), modern political organization
 Serbian National Council of Slavonia, Baranja and Western Syrmia, former political organization
 Serbian National Council of Kosovo and Metohija
 Serbian National Council of Montenegro, created in 2008
 Serbian National Defense Council, an organization in the USA

See also
 Serbian (disambiguation)